Achaean Range is a mountain range rising to  in the central part of Anvers Island in the Palmer Archipelago. Surveyed by the Falkland Islands Dependencies Survey (FIDS) in 1955 and named by the United Kingdom Antarctic Place-Names Committee (UK-APC) for the Achaeans, one of the opposing forces of the Trojan War in Homer's Iliad.

List of mountains 
Surveyed by the FIDS in 1955 and named by the UK-APC for Achilles, the central figure in Homer's Iliad.
 Mount Agamemnon is a snow-covered mountain, marking the south limit of the Achaean Range. It is part of the Mount Francais massif but has a separate summit 1.5 miles (2.4 km) west of the main peak of Mount Francais. It was surveyed by the FIDS in 1944, and again in 1955. Named by the UK-APC for Agamemnon, Commander in Chief of the Achaean forces at Troy in Homer's Iliad.
 Mount Nestor is a mountain, the northernmost of the Achaean Range. Its western side rises steeply from Marr Ice Piedmont; its eastern side is a jumble of crevasses and jagged rock pinnacles. Surveyed by the FIDS in 1955 and named by the UK-APC for Nestor, oldest of the Achaean chieftains fighting at Troy in Homer's Iliad.

See also
 Achilles Heel
 Patroclus Hill

References

Mountain ranges of the Palmer Archipelago
Geography of Anvers Island